Agnieszka Skrzypulec (born 3 June 1989 in Szczecin) is a Polish sports sailor.

At the 2012 Summer Olympics and 2016 Summer Olympics, she competed in the Women's 470 class.  At the 2012 Summer Olympics, she competed with Jolanta Ogar.  They were the first pair to represent Poland in the women's 470 class.  At the 2016 Olympics she competed with Irmina Gliszczynska.  Skrzypulec and Gliszczynska won the 2017 Women's 470 World Championship.  It was their first World Championship medal, and also Poland's first World 470 Championships gold.  Previously they had finished 7th at the 2016 European Championships and 6th at the 2015 470 World Championship and 5th at the 2016 470 World Championship.  Skrzypulec competed at the 2013 European Championships with Natalia Wojcik.

For the 2017 European Championships, Skrzypulec teamed up with Ogar again, winning bronze.  Ogar had originally competed for Poland, switched to Austrian nationality and then returned to Polish colours.

For the 2017 505 Open Polish Championships, Skrzypulec teamed up with Holger Jess winning gold.

Skrzypulec is coached by Zdzisław Staniul.

Skrzypulec began sailing at 8 and racing at 10.  She was encouraged to take up sailing by her parents who first met on a yacht.

References

External links 
 
 
 
 

1989 births
Living people
Polish female sailors (sport)
470 class world champions
World champions in sailing for Poland
Olympic sailors of Poland
Olympic medalists in sailing
Olympic silver medalists for Poland
Sailors at the 2012 Summer Olympics – 470
Sailors at the 2016 Summer Olympics – 470
Sailors at the 2020 Summer Olympics – 470
Medalists at the 2020 Summer Olympics
Sportspeople from Szczecin